Paolo Bonolis (born 14 June 1961) is an Italian television host. He made his debut in 1981 on Tre, due, uno, contatto..., a program for children that aired on Italian national broadcaster Rai.

Biography
In 1982, he moved to Italia 1 where he hosted Bim bum bam, again a program for children. He anchored Bim Bum Bam until 1990 and then he hosted some variety shows like Urka!, Bulli & pupe, Non è la RAI and Belli freschi. After that, he signed back with RAI and hosted a few prime time shows like I cervelloni, Beato tra le donne and the quiz show Luna park, on air in the evening in RAI.

In 1996 he went back to Mediaset, where he successfully hosted Tira & molla and the prime time shows Ciao Darwin and Chi ha incastrato Peter Pan?. Beginning in the same year he also hosted on Canale 5 the satirical news program Striscia la notizia. The program was anchored along with Bonolis's longstanding collaborator, the singer and comic actor Luca Laurenti.

He returned in RAI in 2003, when he presented Domenica In and, later, Affari tuoi, the Italian version of Deal or No Deal, one of Rai's most fondly-remembered game shows. After that he presented the Festival di Sanremo 2005, the most important Italian music festival, having a lot of success. He repeated this experience in 2009 with Ivan Olita.

In the second part of the 2000s (decade) he hosted, for Canale 5, programs like Il senso della vita and some new editions of the successful shows Ciao Darwin and Chi ha incastrato Peter Pan?.

In 2006, he debuted in the movie industry with the film Commediasexi.

World records 

Paolo Bonolis has pronounced 335 words in one minute. The words are a part of the first chapter of The Betrothed (in Italian "I Promessi Sposi").

Advertising
From 2000 to 2011, together with Luca Laurenti, he took part in 30 adverts for Lavazza coffee, replacing Tullio Solenghi in the advertising campaign "Paradise", created in 1995.

Personal life 
Bonolis, who has Romanian roots, is a devoted fan of Inter Milan. In an interview with the TV Show 'Oggi', his daughter Anna Carollo claimed that Bonolis turned into a 'kid' whenever Inter played, due to his strong passion.

Television
Bim Bum Bam (1982–1990)
Doppio slalom (1990)
Urka! (1991)
Sabato notte live (1992)
Bulli e pupe (1992)
Festival internazionale Stelle del circo (1992)
Non è la RAI (1992–1993)
Belli freschi (1993)
Sei un fenomeno (1991)
Occhio allo specchio (1993)
I cervelloni (1994–1996)
Beato tra le donne (1994–1997)
Miss Italia nel mondo (1994–1996)
Regalo di Natale (1994)
La notte degli angeli (1994)
Luna Park (1995–1996)
36° Premio della Regia Televisiva (1996)
Tira e molla (1996–1998)
Un disco per l'estate (1997–1998)
Il gatto e la volpe (1997)
Ciao Darwin (1998–2000, 2003, 2007, 2010, 2016, 2019)
Chi ha incastrato Peter Pan? (1999–2000, 2009–2010, 2017)
Striscia la notizia (2000–2003)
La notte dei Telegatti (2000)
Italiani (2001)
Domenica in (2003–2004)
Affari tuoi (2003–2005)
55°edizione del Festival di Sanremo (2005)
Serie A (2005)
Il senso della vita (2005–2006, 2007–2008, 2011)
Fattore C (2006)
59th Sanremo Music Festival (2009)
Avanti un altro! (Since 2011)
Music (2017)

References

External links

Paolo Bonolis: "Sono il farfallone della tv" Interview 

Living people
1961 births
Italian television presenters
Italian people of Romanian descent